Solomon Islands is an overwhelmingly Christian majority country, with adherents of Islam being a minuscule minority. Because of the secular nature of the country's constitution, Muslims are free to proselytize and build places of worship in the country. Islam first entered the country in 1987, when a Ghanaian missionary belonging to the Ahmadiyya movement visited Guadalcanal on a reconnaissance trip lasting three years. Today, there are two major Islamic branches in the country, the Ahmadiyya Muslim Community and Sunni Islam. According to a 2007 report by the United States Department of State's International Religious Freedom Report, there are approximately 350 Muslims in the country. However, the Australian Journal of International Affairs suggests that there may be as many as 1,000 Ahmadiyya in the country alone, or 0.14% of the population.

Subgroups

Ahmadiyya
Islam was first introduced by an Ahmadi Muslim missionary, Hafiz Jibrail from Ghana. He visited the country from 1987 for three years and managed to draw a handful of converts to Islam, after which he left for Ghana. The Community then continued to flourish and practice their faith for over a decade without external contact from members of the international Ahmadiyya Muslim Community. In the years 2000 to 2005, the Community sent another missionary, as a result of which the Community grew to approximately 1,000 members. The Community is headquartered in Honiara, the capital of Solomon Islands, and is present in villages on Guadalcanal, the Russells, Savo, and Bellona islands.

Sunni
Sunni Muslims first entered the country in 1995 as a result of dawah efforts from members of the Tablighi Jamaat. Sunni Muslims have publicly differentiated from Ahmadi Muslims and claim to represent the 'true' orthodox Islam. The Community claims to have more members than the Ahmadiyya Community.

References

External links
 Pacific: Islam making inroads in Melanesia

Religion in the Solomon Islands
Solomon Islands